In the Heart is the fifteenth studio album by the funk/R&B band Kool & the Gang, released on November 21, 1983. The album became a hit and brought a return to the Billboard charts for the band. The hit love song, "Joanna", soared to number two on the charts in the U.S. and UK, and hit number one on the U.S. R&B chart. "Straight Ahead" was only #103 in the U.S. but a top twenty hit in the UK, while "Tonight" was a top twenty in the U.S.

Track listing

Personnel
Bass and Synclavier – Robert "Kool" Bell
Drums – George Brown
Guitar – Charles Smith
Tenor saxophone; OB-X synthesizer; backing vocals – Ronald "Khalis" Bell
Lead and backing vocals – James "J.T." Taylor
Trombone; backing vocals – Clifford Adams
Keyboards; alto saxophone; Memory Moog, Mini Moog, and OB-X synthesizers, backing vocals – Curtis "Fitz" Williams
Alto saxophone – Dennis "D.T." Thomas
Trumpet – Michael Ray, Robert "Spike" Mickens
Horns arranged by – Kool & The Gang
Strings arranged by – Greg Poree
Concertmaster – Gene Orloff
Contractor (Strings) – Joe Malin
Chief engineer - Jim Bonnefond
Engineers – Cliff Hodsdon, Nelson Ayres
Mixed By – Gabe Vigorito, Ronald Bell, Jim Bonnefond
Mastered by – Jose Rodriguez
Producer – Jim Bonnefond, Ronald Bell, Kool & The Gang
 CD Mastering - Joe Gastwirt

Certifications

References

Kool & the Gang albums
1983 albums